Charles Waldo Bailey II (April 28, 1929January 3, 2012) was an American journalist, newspaper editor and novelist.

Born in Boston, Massachusetts, the son of John Washburn Bailey and Catherine (née Smith), he graduated from Harvard University in 1950. He then worked for the Minneapolis Tribune, serving as its editor from 1972 to 1982.  Bailey co-wrote, with Fletcher Knebel, the best-selling political thriller novel Seven Days in May (1962), and several other novels. He died in Englewood, New Jersey.

Further reading

References

External links
 
 

1929 births
2012 deaths
20th-century American novelists
20th-century American male writers
21st-century American novelists
American newspaper editors
American thriller writers
Deaths from Parkinson's disease
Neurological disease deaths in New Jersey
Harvard University alumni
Journalists from New Jersey
Star Tribune people
People from Englewood, New Jersey
Writers from Minneapolis
Writers from Boston
Novelists from New Jersey
American male novelists
20th-century American journalists
American male journalists
21st-century American male writers
Novelists from Massachusetts
Novelists from Minnesota
21st-century American non-fiction writers
American male non-fiction writers